Something in Her Eye is a 1915 American silent comedy film featuring Oliver Hardy.

Cast
 Billie Rhodes - Trixie Gale, the Girl with something in her eye
 Oliver Hardy - The Grocer (as Babe Hardy)

See also
 List of American films of 1915

External links

1915 films
1915 comedy films
1915 short films
American silent short films
American black-and-white films
Silent American comedy films
American comedy short films
1910s American films